In mathematics, Boas–Buck polynomials are sequences of polynomials  defined from analytic functions  and  by generating functions of the form

.

References

Polynomials